Aurora FC was a Canadian semi-professional soccer club based in Aurora, Ontario. The club continues to operate as a youth soccer club. The club was founded in 1964 as a youth soccer club and added its semi-professional club in League1 Ontario in 2016.  The team was initially known as Aurora United FC during their debut season, before changing their name to Aurora FC beginning in 2017. The team plays home games at Stewart Burnett Park, which was opened in 2018. They departed League1 Ontario following 2020, becoming an affiliate club of Simcoe County Rovers and transferring their League1 Ontario license to them.

History

The club's foundation dates back to 1964, when they were founded as a youth club under the name Aurora Youth Soccer Club.

In 2015, while playing in the amateur Ontario Soccer League, the team was invited by the Peru Olympic football team to play an exhibition match, after Peru had finished playing in the 2015 Pan American Games. The Peruvians defeated Aurora 5–0.

The team added its semi-professional teams in League1 Ontario in the men's and women's division in 2016 under the name Aurora United FC. The men's team announced former Canadian national team and Toronto FC player Jim Brennan as the club's first head coach. They played their inaugural match on April 29, 2016 on the road against Durham United FC, which ended in a 2–1 defeat. The women's team debuted on May 7 against Vaughan Azzurri with a 1–1 draw.

In 2017, the semi-professional club and youth club decided to formally adopt the same Aurora FC name and logo to better unite the two and to remove the Youth term association with the semi-professional club, while maintaining their connection to the team nickname Aurora Stingers in the new club crest.  At the end of the season, head coach Jim Brennan left the team to join the new top tier Canadian Premier League, becoming the coach of York9 FC. The club did not return to League1 Ontario for the 2021 season, and instead became an affiliate club of new team Simcoe County Rovers, transferring their League1 Ontario license to them.

Seasons

Men

Women

Notable former players
The following players have either played at the professional or international level, either before or after playing for the League1 Ontario team:

Men

Women

References

Soccer clubs in Ontario
League1 Ontario teams
Association football clubs established in 1964
Association football clubs disestablished in 2020